Harrison Clark may refer to:
 Harrison Clark (Medal of Honor), American Civil War soldier
 Harrison Clark (footballer), English footballer